Airag may refer to:

Airag, also spelled ayrag, the Mongolian word for fermented horse milk, an alcoholic beverage; see kumis, the Turkic name under which it is more widely known throughout Central Asia
Airag, Dornogovi, a sum (district) in Dornogovi Province, Mongolia